Clement Edward Cottrell (28 May 1854 – 21 January 1897) was a Victorian era English sportsman born in London, England. He played lawn tennis and won the Championship of the Esher LTC six times between (1877-1882)  In addition he was a first class cricketer who played for Middlesex. He died Brighton, Sussex, England.

Early life
Cotterell was born on 28 May 1854 in Westminster, London, England.

Cricket career
Cottrell was a first-class cricketer and fast-medium bowler, Clement Cottrell was in the Harrow XI in 1872 and he played club cricket for many years for Esher in Surrey. He played intermittently for Middlesex between 1876 and 1885.

Tennis career
He was also a notable lawn tennis player who the Championship of the Esher LTC six times between 1877 and 1882.

Work
Clement Edward Cottrell worked in the London Stock Exchange as a trader.

References

1854 births
1897 deaths
19th-century English people
19th-century male tennis players
British male tennis players
English cricketers
English male tennis players
Middlesex cricketers
Marylebone Cricket Club cricketers
Gentlemen of the South cricketers
Gentlemen of England cricketers
I Zingari cricketers
C. I. Thornton's XI cricketers
E. J. Sanders' XI cricketers
Gentlemen of Marylebone Cricket Club cricketers